The Statue of Karomama, the Divine Adoratrice of Amun is a bronze statue depicting a priestess of the 22nd Dynasty of Egypt, circa 870 BCE. It was discovered in Karnak, and is now on display at the Musée du Louvre.

Jean-François Champollion acquired the statue in 1829, and misidentified the subject as Karomama II, wife and sister of Pharoh Takelot II; the Karomama depicted is in fact a daughter of Osorkon I.

The statue is made of bronze, with gold, solver and electrum damascening inlay. The overseer of the treasury Ahentefnakht offered it to her.

Notes and references

Source 

 Gabrielle Bartz et Eberhard König, Le Musée du Louvre, éditions Place des Victoires, Paris, 2005, .
 

Bronze sculptures
Archaeological discoveries in Egypt
Egyptian antiquities of the Louvre